Sonam Bisht is an Indian beauty pageant and reality show contestant turned television actress.

She hails from Dehradun and studied at Kendriya Vidyalaya Hathibarkala. In 2013 she was the first runner-up in the Miss Uttarakhand contest. She took part in the 2014 Miss India contest.

That same year, she was also a contestant in the third season of reality show India's Best Cinestars Ki Khoj.

In 2015, she landed a role in Zee TV's show Lajwanti. She is currently seen in Star Plus's soap opera Suhani Si Ek Ladki where she plays the negative lead, Yuvraj's second wife.

Television

References 

Beauty pageant contestants from India
Participants in Indian reality television series
Indian television actresses
Actresses from Dehradun
Kendriya Vidyalaya alumni
Female models from Uttarakhand
Living people
Year of birth missing (living people)